"Give Me the Keys (And I'll Drive You Crazy)" is a song by Huey Lewis and the News, released in January 1989 as the third single from the album Small World. The single peaked at No. 47 on the US Billboard Hot 100.

"Give Me the Keys" was the first Huey Lewis and the News single to fail to reach the Top 40 portion of the Hot 100 since "Workin' for a Livin'" in 1982, ending a string of 13 consecutive Top 40 hits for the band.

Chart performance

References

Huey Lewis and the News songs
1988 songs
1989 singles
Songs written by Huey Lewis
Chrysalis Records singles